El Massa (in Arabic المساء meaning The Evening) is an Algerian daily newspaper printed in Arabic.

History and profile
El Massa was started in 1985 as the first Algerian newspaper to be published in an evening edition. The paper is published by and supportive of the Algerian government.

See also
List of Algerian newspapers

References

External links
Official website

1985 establishments in Algeria
Arabic-language newspapers
Mass media in Algiers
Newspapers published in Algeria
Publications established in 1985